Wyoming County may refer to one of several counties in the United States:

 Wyoming County, New York
 Wyoming County, Pennsylvania
 Wyoming County, West Virginia 

For a list of the 23 counties in the U.S. state of Wyoming, see List of counties in Wyoming